Abolfazl Mehreganfar is an Iranian retired fighter pilot of Grumman F-14 Tomcat who served during the Iran–Iraq War.

French military historian Pierre Razoux has credited him with 6 aerial victories, a record that qualifies him as a flying ace. He achieved the rank of 2nd brigadier general.

See also 

 List of Iranian flying aces

References 

Iran–Iraq War flying aces
Iranian flying aces
Living people
Islamic Republic of Iran Army brigadier generals
Year of birth missing (living people)